Two Pieces for Piano is a work for piano solo composed in 192930 by John Ireland.

A performance of both pieces takes about 8 minutes. They are:

 February's Child
 Aubade 

An aubade is a morning love song (as opposed to a serenade, which is in the evening), or a song or poem about lovers separating at dawn.

References 

Solo piano pieces by John Ireland
1930 compositions